The Knockout Stage of the 1992 Federation Cup Europe/Africa Zone was the final stage of the Zonal Competition involving teams from Europe and Africa. Those that qualified for this stage placed first and second in their respective pools.

The eight teams were then randomly drawn into a three-stage knockout tournament, with the winner qualifying for the World Group.

Draw

Quarterfinals

Greece vs. Latvia

Croatia vs. Ireland

Norway vs. Slovenia

Yugoslavia vs. South Africa

Semifinals

Latvia vs. Croatia

Slovenia vs. South Africa

Final

Croatia vs. South Africa

See also
Fed Cup structure

References

External links
 Fed Cup website

1992 Federation Cup Europe/Africa Zone